Walter Buschhoff (1923–2010) was a German stage, film and television actor. He was married to the actress Maria Körber.

Selected filmography

 IA in Oberbayern (1956) - Dr. Hans von Spörling
 Heiße Ernte (1956) - Oskar Blume
 Saison in Oberbayern (1956) - Paul
 Vater, unser bestes Stück (1957) - Ferruccio
 Two Bavarians in the Harem (1957) - Halim Pascha (uncredited)
 Der Schinderhannes (1958) - Iltis Jakob
 Two Times Adam, One Time Eve (1959) - Matti
 Kein Mann zum Heiraten (1959) - Sizilianer
 The Miracle of Father Malachia (1961) - Cop Pohl
 Life Begins at Eight (1962) - Willibald Barthels
 Dicke Luft (1962) - Prokurist
 Die endlose Nacht (1963) - Ernst Kramer
 The House in Karp Lane (1965) - Krauthammer
 Die schwedische Jungfrau (1965) - Georg
 Who Wants to Sleep? (1965) - Doctor
 Die Liebesquelle (1966) - Wirt, the Innkeeper
 Once a Greek (1966) - Dolder
 Scarabea: How Much Land Does a Man Need? (1969) - Herr bach
  (1969) - Phileas Leuwenstam
 Köpfchen in das Wasser, Schwänzchen in die Höh (1969)
 Help, I Love Twins (1969) - Busebius
 Ehepaar sucht gleichgesinntes (1969) - Staatsanwalt
 Hotel by the Hour (1970) - Lucas Freund
 Heintje - Mein bester Freund (1970) - Herr Hartmann
 The Priest of St. Pauli (1970) - Generaldirektor Carl Ostro
 Das haut den stärksten Zwilling um (1971) - Peter's Boss
 Wintermärchen (1971) - First Lieutenant
 The New Adventures of Vidocq (1971, TV series) - 	 Le docteur
 Bloody Friday (1972) - Walter Lotzmann
 The Stuff That Dreams Are Made Of (1972) - Kuschke
 Jorden runt med Fanny Hill (1974) - William
 Die Angst ist ein zweiter Schatten (1975)
 Vortex (1976) - Le docteur Ruth
 L'éducation amoureuse de Valentin (1976) - Le directeur de l'hôtel
  (1976) - Don Alfonso
 Silence in the Forest (1976) - Sensburg
  (1986) - German Minister
  (1988) - Otto von Ludwig
 Plaza Real (1988) - Weisse
 Wer zweimal lügt (1993) - Franz Huebner
  (1995) - Professor Kurt

References

Bibliography 
 Goble, Alan. The Complete Index to Literary Sources in Film. Walter de Gruyter, 1999.

External links 
 

1923 births
2010 deaths
German male stage actors
German male film actors
People from Worms, Germany